Forbidden love may refer to a romantic relationship between two individuals which is highly discouraged or strongly opposed by a third party, such as the public; either due to cultural, societal, political, or religious reasons. An apt example being the classic tragedy Romeo and Juliet, written by famous playwright William Shakespeare.

Forbidden Love may also refer to:

Film 
 Forbidden Love (1920 film), English title for the German film Verbotene Liebe
 Forbidden Love (1927 film), a German silent film
 Forbidden Love (1938 film), a Czech film
 Forbidden Love (1982 film), an American TV film
 The Man from Niger, a 1940 French film also known as Forbidden Love

Television
 Forbidden Love (2004 TV series), a South Korean drama series
 Forbidden Love (2011 TV series), a Syrian television series
 Forbidden Love (2020 TV series), an Indian television series
 Forbidden Love: The Unashamed Stories of Lesbian Lives, a 1992 Canadian documentary film
 Verbotene Liebe (Forbidden Love), a German daytime soap opera
 Zabranena Lyubov (Forbidden Love), a Bulgarian soap opera
 Zabranjena ljubav (Forbidden Love), a Croatian daytime soap opera
 Aşk-ı Memnu (2008 TV series) (Forbidden Love), a Turkish Romantic drama television series

Music 
 The Forbidden Love EP, a 2000 EP by Death Cab for Cutie
 "Forbidden Love", a 1994 song by Madonna from Bedtime Stories
 "Forbidden Love", a 2005 song by Madonna from Confessions on a Dance Floor
 "Forbidden Love", a 1979 song by Madleen Kane

Literary
 Forbidden Love (novel), a 2003 novel by Norma Khouri

See also
 Forbidden Lover (disambiguation)